The Malatestiana Library, also known as the Malatesta Novello Library, is a public library in the city of Cesena in northern Italy. Purpose-built from 1447 to 1452 and opened in 1454, and named after the local aristocrat Malatesta Novello, it is significant for being the first civic library in Europe, i.e. belonging to the commune rather than the church or a noble family, and open to the general public. The library was inscribed in UNESCO's Memory of the World Register in 2005.

History and influence 
The building and creation of the library was commissioned by the Lord of Cesena, Malatesta Novello. Construction was directed by Matteo Nuti from Fano (a pupil of Leon Battista Alberti) and lasted from 1447 to 1452. At Novello's direction, the books were owned by the commune of Cesena, not the monastery or the family. Because of this governing structure, the collection was not dispersed like many monastic libraries.

In 2005 UNESCO included the Library in the Memory of the World Programme Register.

Facility 
 

The Malatestiana Library is one of the very few libraries (another one is the Librije in Zutphen, Netherlands) in the world of the so-called humanistic-conventual type, which blends humanistic principles with architecture otherwise reserved for religious buildings, and has preserved its structure, fittings and codices since its opening more than 550 years ago. The main doorway was the work of sculptor Agostino di Duccio (1418–1481). The walnut door at the main entrance dates back to 1454 and was carved by the artist Cristoforo from San Giovanni in Persiceto.

Inside, the library features geometric design, typical of the early Italian Renaissance style. The aula has the layout of a basilica (reflecting the importance of the library as a "temple of culture"), with three naves divided by ten rows of white columns made from local stone; there are eleven bays in each aisle, which are pole vaulted. The central nave is barrel vaulted and ends with a rose under which is the gravestone of Malatesta Novello.

The fittings are composed of 58 desks, with coat of arms at the sides. The light comes in through the 44 Venetian style windows, which were purpose designed to provide ideal lighting for reading.

Holdings 

The library has over 400,000 books, including over 340 codices covering various fields such as religion, Greek and Latin classics, sciences and medicine, and about 3,200 manuscripts from the 16th century.  The oldest manuscript in the library is a copy of Isidore's Etymologiae.

References

External links 

 

Public libraries in Italy
Libraries in Cesena
Memory of the World Register
Buildings and structures in Cesena
Education in Emilia-Romagna
Buildings and structures completed in 1452
Libraries established in the 15th century